Richland is an unincorporated community in southwestern Grainger County, in the U.S. state of Tennessee. It is located partially inside Blaine's city limits and urban growth boundary.

History
A post office called Richland was in operation from 1877 until 1902.

Notable people 
 Albert Miller Lea, a surveyor and engineer, was born in Richland.

References

Unincorporated communities in Grainger County, Tennessee
Unincorporated communities in Tennessee